The 2017–18 Duke Blue Devils men's basketball team represented Duke University during the 2017–18 NCAA Division I men's basketball season. They were coached by 38th-year head coach, Mike Krzyzewski. The Blue Devils played their home games at Cameron Indoor Stadium in Durham, North Carolina as members of the Atlantic Coast Conference. They finished the season 29–8, 13–5 in ACC play to finish in second place. They defeated Notre Dame in the quarterfinals of the ACC tournament before losing to North Carolina in the semifinals. They received an at-large bid to the NCAA tournament as the No. 2 seed in the Midwest region. There they defeated Iona, Rhode Island, and Syracuse to advance to the Elite Eight. In the Elite Eight, they lost to No. 1 seed Kansas in overtime. The 2017-18 Blue Devils team was one of the few teams in NCAA history to send their whole starting five pro in the off-season following their season.  Four of them got drafted (two in lottery, one late first round, one second round) and another got signed as undrafted free agent.  Throughout the season the whole starting five was in first round NBA draft projections (January 1, 2018 date source).

Previous season
The Blue Devils finished the 2016–17 season 28–9, 11–7 in ACC play to finish in fifth place. They became the first ACC team to win four games in four days on their way to winning the ACC tournament. They received the ACC's automatic bid to the NCAA tournament as the East Region's #2 seed, where they defeated #15 Troy in the First Round before being upset by #7 South Carolina in the Second Round.

Offseason

Departures

2017 recruiting class

2018 recruiting class

Roster

Depth chart

Schedule and results

|-
!colspan=12 style=| Exhibition

|-
!colspan=12 style=| Regular season

|-
!colspan=12 style=| ACC Tournament

|-
!colspan=12 style=| NCAA tournament

Ranking movement

^Coaches did not release a Week 2 poll.
*AP does not release post-NCAA Tournament rankings

References

Duke
Duke Blue Devils men's basketball seasons
Duke
2017 in sports in North Carolina
2018 in sports in North Carolina